The Virgin Ambient Series was a series of albums released on the UK Virgin Records label between 1993 and 1997. Of the 24 albums released in the series, 15 were compilations.

Discography

Album series
Ambient compilation albums
Virgin Records compilation albums
Compilation album series